Time to Say Hello: The Autobiography is a 2008 autobiography by Katherine Jenkins. It was published in hardback in January 2008 by Orion Books.

It was released on paperback on 5 February 2009.

The book's title comes from the song, "Time to Say Goodbye".

References

2008 non-fiction books
Music autobiographies
Katherine Jenkins